USS Oyster Bay (AGP-6), originally and later AVP-28, was a United States Navy motor torpedo boat tender in commission from 1943 to 1946. She saw service in World War II.

From 1957 to 1993, the former Oyster Bay served in the Italian Navy as the special forces tender Pietro Cavezzale (A 5301).

Construction, commissioning, and shakedown

Oyster Bay was laid down as a Barnegat-class small seaplane tender designated AVP-28 at Lake Washington Shipyard, Houghton Washington, on April 17, 1942, and was launched on September 7, 1942, sponsored by Mrs. William K. Harrill. On May 1, 1943, she was reclassified as a motor torpedo tender and redesignated AGP–6 and, accordingly, completed to a modified design to allow her to fulfill this new role.  She was commissioned on November 17, 1943.

Oyster Bay departed Seattle, Washington, on December 7, 1943, for shakedown at San Diego, California, which lasted for the remainder of 1943.

World War II service

New Guinea campaign

Oyster Bay got underway from San Diego on January 2, 1944, steaming to Brisbane, Australia, en route Milne Bay, New Guinea, for motor torpedo boat tender operations in support of the New Guinea campaign. She serviced two squadrons of motor torpedo boats beginning on February 28, 1944, and, on March 9, 1944, got underway escorting 15 patrol torpedo boats (PT boats) to Seeadler Harbor in the Admiralty Islands.

The spring of 1944 was an active one for Oyster Bay. On March 14, 1944, she bombarded the Japanese shore installations on Pityilu Island in support of the United States Army. On March 20, 1944, she was underway for Langemak, New Guinea, with 42 wounded soldiers for evacuation to Base Hospital, Finschhafen, New Guinea. After returning to Seeadler Harbor on March 31, 1944, she bombarded Ndrilo Island to the east of Seeadler Harbor preparatory to the landing there by U.S. Army ground forces.

Oyster Bay shifted to Dreger Harbor on April 19, 1944. Allied forces moved on Aitape on April 22, 1944, and on April 24, 1944, two days after the landings at Aitape, Oyster Bay departed for the area with 15 PT boats. Japanese planes attacked the convoy on April 27, 1944, but, while one PT boat was hit, Oyster Bay escaped damage.

In May 1944, Oyster Bay proceeded to Hollandia, an area of heated Allied action. Air raid alerts were frequent, but no Japanese attacks ensued. Oyster Bay got underway to Wakde Island on June 5, 1944, with two squadrons of PT boats. After Allied forces had invaded Wakde Island on May 17, 1944, to capture a major Japanese air base there, the Japanese continued to hammer away at the newly acquired airstrip. Later in June 1944, Oyster Bay bombarded shore installations on the Wicki River and at Samar Village, preparatory to U.S. Army attacks.

Leaving Mios Woendi Island on July 12, 1944, Oyster Bay reported to Brisbane for shipyard availability. A British Royal Air Force plane struck the top of the ship's mast, carried away her antennae and damaged her navigation lights on July 22, 1944, but hasty repairs permitted Oyster Bay to depart for Mios Woendi on August 16, 1944.

Philippines campaign

Oyster Bay then steamed on to Morotai, needed as a staging area for the Philippines campaign. As the Allies assaulted the beaches of Leyte Island in the Philippines in October 1944, Oyster Bay set out for Leyte Gulf. Japanese planes counterattacked, but U.S. Navy planes and anti-aircraft fire took a heavy toll of them. In November 1944, Oyster Bay went to general quarters 221 times, but was not attacked. She shifted to San Juanico Strait on November 21, 1944, and on November 24, 1944, while taking on gasoline, she was attacked by two Nakajima B5N "Kate" torpedo bombers that were driven off by heavy antiaircraft fire. Two Mitsubishi A6M "Zeke" fighters dived on Oyster Bay on the November 26, 1944, but intense antiaircraft fire shot them both down.

In January 1945, Oyster Bay got underway for Hollandia, then returned to Leyte Gulf for motor torpedo boat tender operations on February 8, 1945. Departing for the invasion of Zamboanga on March 6, 1945, she arrived two days before the invasion and remained with the bombardment group until the landings. Oyster Bay next rendezvoused with PT boats in Sarangani Bay at Mindoro on April 24, 1945, and supported them during night raids against the Japanese positions in Davao Gulf. In May 1945, Oyster Bay reported to Leyte Gulf, thence steaming to Samar. She departed on May 18, 1945, for Tawi Tawi, where she continued motor torpedo boat tender operations until she returned to Guinan Harbor on August 6, 1945.

Awards
Oyster Bay received five battle stars for World War II service.

Post-World War II service

World War II ended with the cessation of hostilities with Japan on August 15, 1945.  Oyster Bay turned toward the United States on November 10, 1945, and steamed into San Francisco Bay, California, on November 29, 1945.

Decommissioning, reserve, and disposal
Decommissioned on March 26, 1946, Oyster Bay was stricken from the Naval Vessel Register on April 12, 1946, and transferred to the Maritime Commission on August 12, 1946.

Transferred back to the U.S. Navy on January 3, 1949, Oyster Bay was reclassified as a small seaplane tender and redesignated AVP–28 on March 16, 1949.  She was berthed at Stockton, California, where she remained in the Pacific Reserve Fleet until 1957, seeing no active service as a seaplane tender.

Pietro Cavezzale (A 5301)
Oyster Bay was transferred to the Government of Italy on 23 October 1957. She then served in the Italian Navy as the special forces tender Pietro Cavezzale (A 5301).

The Italian Navy decommissioned Pietro Cavezzale in October 1993 and she was stricken by the Italian Navy on 31 March 1994. She was sold for scrapping in February 1996.

References

Department of the Navy: Naval Historical Center: Online Library of Selected Images: U.S. Navy Ships: USS Oyster Bay (AGP-6, originally & later AVP-28), 1943–1957
NavSource Online: Service Ship Photo Archive AVP-28 / AGP-6 Oyster Bay
 Chesneau, Roger. Conways All the World's Fighting Ships 1922–1946. New York: Mayflower Books, Inc., 1980. .

Barnegat-class motor torpedo boat tenders
1942 ships
World War II auxiliary ships of the United States
Barnegat-class seaplane tenders
Ships built at Lake Washington Shipyard